Saint Corbinian (670 – 8 September c. 730 AD) was a Frankish bishop. After living as a hermit near Chartres for fourteen years, he made a pilgrimage to Rome. Pope Gregory II sent him to Bavaria. His opposition to the marriage of Duke Grimoald to his brother's widow, Biltrudis, caused Corbinian to go into exile for a time. His feast day is 8 September. The commemoration of the translation of his relics is 20 November.

Life
Corbinian was born and baptized as Waldegiso at Châtres, near Melun, in Frankish territory. He was named after his father, who may have died when Corbinian was an infant. Soon after his father's death, his mother Corbiniana renamed Waldegiso to "Corbinian", after herself. Nothing else is known of his childhood. The early source for Corbinian's life is the Vita Corbiniani of Bishop Arbeo of Freising.

He lived in Châtres on the road to Orléans as a hermit for fourteen years, near a church dedicated to Saint Germain. His reputation attracted students to him, which distracted him from his hermitage. His devotion to Saint Peter the Apostle prompted a decision to make a journey to Rome, accompanied by some of the disciples. While in Rome, Pope Gregory II admonished him to use his talents to evangelize Bavaria. Corbinian, who may already have been a bishop or who was so consecrated by Gregory, was sent to minister to Grimoald, the Frankish Duke of Bavaria. Corbinian probably arrived in Bavaria in 724.

On a mountain near Freising, where there was already a sanctuary, the saint erected a Benedictine monastery and a school, which came to be governed by his brother Erembert, after his death. In 738, when Saint Boniface regulated the ecclesial structure in the Duchy of Bavaria by creating four dioceses to be governed by the archbishop of Mainz, Erembert was chosen first Bishop of Freising.

Soon after settling, Corbinian denounced Grimoald's marriage to his brother's widow, Biltrudis, though Grimoald had already repented of his incest. This incited his anger and the chagrin of his wife, who excoriated Corbinian, labeling him a foreign interloper. Finally, she arranged to have him murdered. Corbinian fled Freising until Grimoald was killed and Biltrudis carried off by invaders in 725. Corbinian returned on the invitation of Grimoald's successor, Huebert, and continued his apostolic labors at Freising until his own death in 730.

Corbinian's body, buried at Merano, was translated to Freising in 769 by the aforementioned Bishop Arbeo, author of Corbinian's vita, and is now entombed in Freising Cathedral.

Corbinian's bear
Corbinian's symbol is the saddled bear.  According to his hagiography, a bear killed Corbinian's pack horse on the way to Rome and so the saint commanded it to carry his load. Once he arrived in Rome, however, he let the bear go, and it lumbered back to its native forest.  Both the heraldic element and the legend itself carry significant symbolism. One interpretation is that the bear tamed by God's grace is the Bishop of Freising himself and the pack saddle is the burden of his episcopate. The bear's submission and retreat can also be interpreted as Christianity's "taming" and "domestication" of the ferocity of paganism and, consequentially, the laying of a "[foundation] for a great civilization in the Duchy of Bavaria."

In Catholic iconography

Corbinian's Bear is used as the symbol of Freising in both civic and ecclesiastical heraldry. It appeared on the arms of Pope Benedict XVI, who first adopted the symbol when, still known as Joseph Ratzinger, he was appointed Archbishop of Freising-Munich in March 1977.  He retained the bear in his revised coat of arms when he was elevated to Cardinal in June of the same year, and again on his papal coat of arms when he was elected in 2005.

The scallop shell is a traditional reference to pilgrimage. For Pope Benedict XVI, it also reminded  him of the legend according to which one day St. Augustine, pondering the mystery of the Trinity, saw a child at the seashore playing with a shell, trying to put the water of the ocean into a little hole. Then he heard the words: This hole can no more contain the waters of the ocean than your intellect can comprehend the mystery of God. The crowned Moor is a regional motif in heraldry often seen in Bavaria, Benedict's German homeland.  Benedict has been quoted saying that, in addition to the obvious reference back to Saint Corbinian, the founder of the diocese where Benedict would become bishop in 1977, the bear represents Benedict himself being "tamed by God" to bear the spiritual burdens of Benedict's own ministries first as bishop, then as cardinal, and now as pope.

Gallery
Scenes from the life of Saint Corbinian from a panel in the crypt of Freising Cathedral.

Further reading

Notes

External links
Munich-Freising at Catholic Encyclopedia
 Helmut Zenz: Heiliger Korbinian im Internet includes a gallery of images, a timeline of Corbinian's life, and sources in many languages for further reading
 Den hellige Korbinian av Freising
 Saint Corbinien - Evêque fondateur de l'église en Bavière includes hagiography for Corbinian and pictures of tapestries depicting the story of his life
Butler, Alban. "St. Corbinian, Bishop of Frisingen, Confessor", Lives of the Saints, Vol. IX, (1866)

670 births
730 deaths
Medieval German saints
8th-century Christian saints
Burials in Bavaria
Baiuvarii
8th-century Frankish bishops